XO sauce is a spicy seafood sauce from Hong Kong with an umami flavour. It is commonly used in southern Chinese regions such as Guangdong.

History
Developed in the 1980s in Hong Kong for Cantonese cuisine, XO sauce is made of roughly-chopped dried seafood, including dried scallops (conpoy), fish, and shrimp, which are cooked with chilli peppers, onions, and garlic. This dried seafood-based sauce resembles the Fujianese shacha sauce. Spring Moon, the Chinese restaurant of the Peninsula Hong Kong hotel, is often credited with the invention of XO sauce, although some claim it came from other nearby restaurants in the Tsim Sha Tsui area of Kowloon.

Etymology
The name XO sauce comes from fine XO (extra-old) cognac, which is a popular Western liquor in Hong Kong, and considered by many to be a chic product at the time. The name is a misnomer since the condiment contains no cognac, and it is not really a sauce in the traditional, smooth sense, but more chunky, like a relish. The term XO is often used in Hong Kong to denote high quality, prestige and luxury. Indeed, XO sauce has been marketed in the same manner as French liquor, using packaging of similar colour schemes.

Ingredients
Typical ingredients of XO sauce include dried scallop, red chilli pepper, Jinhua ham, dried shrimp, garlic and canola oil. Some other recipes also call for salted cured fish and diced onion.

Uses

XO sauce can be used as a table condiment or in cooking to enhance the flavour of fish, meats, vegetables, and otherwise bland foods such as tofu or noodles.

See also
 Chili oil
 Dim sum
 List of Chinese sauces
 List of fish sauces
 List of sauces

References

Further reading
 Lo, Eileen Yin-Fei  (2012). Mastering the Art of Chinese Cooking. Chronicle Books. pp. 157–159. 

Cantonese cuisine
Chinese condiments
Hong Kong cuisine
Fish sauces
Umami enhancers
Chinese sauces